Sudan Olympic Committee (IOC code: SUD) is the National Olympic Committee representing Sudan.

See also
 Sudan at the Olympics

External links 

Sudan
 
1956 establishments in Sudan
Olympic
Sports organizations established in 1956